Suspended Animation is a 2001 American thriller film directed and produced by John D. Hancock and starring Alex McArthur.

Cast
Alex McArthur as Tom Kempton
Laura Esterman as Vanessa Boulette
Sage Allen	as Ann Boulette
Maria Cina	as Clara Hansen
Rebecca Harrell as Hilary Kempton
Fred Meyers as Sandor Hansen

Reception
The film received mixed reviews from critics. On the review aggregator website Rotten Tomatoes, the film has a 52% approval rating, based on 25 reviews. The website's consensus reads, "Suspended Animation offers some gory good fun for genre fans, even if the end results don't quite transcend their cheerfully shallow roots."

References

External links

2001 films
American thriller films
Films directed by John D. Hancock
2000s thriller films
Films set in Michigan
Films shot in Indiana
Films shot in Michigan
Films shot in California
2000s English-language films
2000s American films